Set Them Free (foaled February 11, 1990, in Kentucky, died October 30, 2018) was an American thoroughbred mare racehorse.  She is sired by stakes winner Stop The Music, who in turn was sired by the 1960 U.S. Champion 2-Yr-Old Colt, Hail To Reason, out of the Tyrant mare Valseuse.

She was purchased as a two-year-old by Ann and Jerome Moss at the 1992 Fasig-Tipton Calder sale for $45,000 through the late trainer Brian Mayberry and was named for a song by the recording artist Sting.

Known as a sprint specialist, at age two Set Them Free won the Pasadena Stakes at Santa Anita Park and the Debutante Breeders' Cup Stakes at Bay Meadows Racetrack. She placed 11th in the Breeders' Cup Juvenile Fillies.

Set Them Free was best known for her success as a broodmare.  She was the dam of two Kentucky Derby entrants: 2005 winner Giacomo, by Holy Bull, and Tiago, by Pleasant Tap.

Resources
 Pedigree & Partial Stats

1990 racehorse births
Racehorses bred in Kentucky
Racehorses trained in the United States
Thoroughbred family 2-d
2018 racehorse deaths